The Sun goddess of the Earth (Hittite: taknaš dUTU, Luwian: tiyamaššiš Tiwaz) was the Hittite goddess of the underworld. Her Hurrian equivalent was Allani and her Sumerian/Akkadian equivalent was Ereshkigal, both of which had a marked influence on the Hittite goddess from an early date. In the Neo-Hittite period, the Hattian underworld god, Lelwani was also syncretised with her.

In Hittite texts, she is referred to as the "Queen of the Underworld" and possesses a palace with a vizier and servants. In the Hittite New Kingdom, she is attested as the mother of two weather gods. The Sun goddess of the Earth, as a personification of the chthonic aspects of the Sun, had the task of opening the doors to the Underworld. She was said to cleanse all evil, impurity, and sickness on Earth.

In the Hurrian-Hittite "Song of the Ransom," the Sun goddess of the Earth / Allani invites the king of the gods, Tarḫunna/Teššub and his brother Šuwaliyat/Tašmišu to a feast in the Underworld and dances before them. Otherwise, she is mostly attested in curses, oaths, and purification rituals. 

Her worship is also attested in the land of Kizzuwatna.

See also
 List of solar deities

References

Bibliography
 Volkert Haas: Die hethitische Literatur. Walter de Gruyter, Berlin 2006, pp. 112, 178 ff., 227, 253.
 Manfred Krebernik: Götter und Mythen des alten Orients. Verlag C.H. Beck, München 2012, pp. 68, 75.
 Volkert Haas, Heidemarie Koch: Religionen des alten Orients: Hethiter und Iran. Vandenhoeck & Ruprecht, Göttingen 2011, .
 Piotr Taracha: Religions of Second Millennium Anatolia. Harrassowitz, Wiesbaden 2009, .

Hittite deities
Luwian goddesses
Underworld goddesses
Solar goddesses